Allium siphonanthum is a plant species endemic to Yunnan Province in southern China. It grows on hillsides at an elevation of approximately 2800 m.

Allium siphonanthum has bulbs up to 15 mm across. Scape is up to 60 cm tall, round in cross-section. Leaves are long and very narrow, about the same length as the scape but only about 3 mm across, often drooping under its own weight. Umbel is spherical, with a dense cluster of many reddish-purple flowers.

References

siphonanthum
Onions
Flora of China
Flora of Yunnan
Plants described in 1980